Johan Petter Pettersson (29 July 1884 in Jeppo – 26 September 1952) was a Finnish track and field athlete who competed in the 1920 Summer Olympics. He was born in Jeppo. In 1920 he finished sixth in the 56 pound weight throw competition and eleventh in the hammer throw event.

References

External links
profile

1884 births
1952 deaths
People from Nykarleby
Finnish male hammer throwers
Olympic athletes of Finland
Athletes (track and field) at the 1920 Summer Olympics
Olympic weight throwers
Sportspeople from Ostrobothnia (region)